Mutiara Kisaran Stadium is a multi-purpose stadium in the town of Kisaran, Indonesia.  It is currently used mostly for football matches.  The stadium has a capacity of 5,000 people.

It is the home base of PSSA Asahan and PS Bintang Jaya Asahan.

References

Sports venues in Indonesia
Football venues in Indonesia
Multi-purpose stadiums in Indonesia